Richard Charles Hagon (1 November 1855 – 10 December 1944) was an Australian independent politician who served as Lord Mayor of Sydney in 1933. A merchant tailor by profession, Hagon served his first term as an alderman for the City of Sydney from 1909 to 1924, and his second from 1930 until his resignation in 1935.

Hagon was born in Hobart Town, Van Diemen's Land. The colony was officially renamed Tasmania less than two months after his birth. He was married and had five children. On 10 December 1944, he died at his residence in Edgecliff, Sydney, aged 89. He was interred at Waverley Cemetery.

References

1855 births
1944 deaths
20th-century Australian politicians
Independent politicians in Australia
Mayors and Lord Mayors of Sydney
Politicians from Hobart